Roberto Farías Morales (born 31 May 1969) is a Chilean actor. He has appeared in more than thirty films since 2003. He also works in dubbing.

Career 
He studied in various acting workshops, including the María Cánepa Corporation Workshop and the Juan Edmundo González Workshop. In 1997, he graduated from Theater School. He started out in street theater at the age of 25 and has been under the direction of important Chilean directors, such as Gustavo Meza, Raúl Osorio, Luis Ureta, Alexis Moreno and Guillermo Calderón.

Selected filmography

References

External links 

1969 births
Living people
Chilean male film actors